Zdeněk Kubica (born August 8, 1986) is a Czech professional ice hockey left winger. He is currently a free agent having last played for HC Slavia Praha of the Change Liga.

Kubica has previously played in the Czech Extraliga for HC Plzeň, Slavia Praha, Rytíři Kladno and BK Mladá Boleslav, playing 95 games in total. He had numerous loans spells with Slavia from 2015 until he joined the team permanently on November 15, 2019.

References

External links

1986 births
Living people
HC Benátky nad Jizerou players
HC Berounští Medvědi players
Czech ice hockey left wingers
SHK Hodonín players
LHK Jestřábi Prostějov players
HC Kometa Brno players
BK Mladá Boleslav players
Orli Znojmo players
People from Blansko
HC Plzeň players
Rytíři Kladno players
HC Slavia Praha players
SK Horácká Slavia Třebíč players
Stadion Hradec Králové players
Hokej Šumperk 2003 players
Sportspeople from the South Moravian Region